Web of Evil is a publication of Quality Comics, which began in November 1952. The comic had a run of twenty-one issues., the final issue being #21 (December 1954).<ref name=gem>Overstreet Comic Book Price Guide, Gemstone Publishing, May 2002, Pg. 837.</ref> Web of Evil is considered by writer Nicky Wright to be an inferior imitation of Exciting Comics' style horror comics.

The final comic book work of artist Jack Cole was in Web of Evil. Web of Evil'' themes include #1 (morphine use), #5 (electrocution), #14 (old witch swipe), #17 (opium drug propaganda), and #18 (acid-in-face story).

References

Web of Evil (Comic)